Theodore Walter Cook, Sr. (February 6, 1922 – October 16, 2006) was a player in the National Football League. He played one season with the Detroit Lions and three with the Green Bay Packers.

References

1922 births
2006 deaths
Players of American football from Birmingham, Alabama
Alabama Crimson Tide football players
Detroit Lions players
Green Bay Packers players